The 9/11 Heroes Medal of Valor is a decoration in the United States, created specifically to honor the 442 public safety officers who were killed in the line of duty during the September 11, 2001 terrorist attacks at the World Trade Center and the empty wing of The Pentagon.

The Medals were presented by President George W. Bush to the families of the fallen officers at The White House on September 9, 2005.

The 9/11 Heroes Medal of Valor, which intentionally resembles the Public Safety Officer Medal of Valor and the military's Medal of Honor, is a gilt, light blue-enamelled, five-pointed, upside-down star (i.e. one arm points downwards), surrounded by a wreath of laurel. The center has a dark blue-enamelled pentagon (representing The Pentagon), with a gilt disc bearing the twin towers of the World Trade Center, the American eagle holding the shield of the United States and laurel, and the date "9. 11. 01". The Medal is suspended on a gilt disc bearing a letter "H" (for Heroism) inside a keystone, (representing the Keystone State of Pennsylvania) surrounded by a wreath of laurels, which is in turn suspended on a neck ribbon, blue with gold and light blue edge stripes and a white center stripe.

Because the 9/11 Heroes Medal of Valor has only been authorized posthumously, and only for one action, it is generally considered a commemorative decoration not intended for wear; therefore the Medal does not come with lapel pin or ribbon bar.

Similar medals

Medal of Honor
Public Safety Officer Medal of Valor
Chaplain's Medal for Heroism

References

External links

Awards and decorations of United States law enforcement agencies
Awards established in 2005
Posthumous recognitions
Aftermath of the September 11 attacks